Title LXIII of the New Hampshire Revised Statutes Annotated has addressed election procedure within New Hampshire since the repealment of Title IV.

RSA 662
RSA 662 is responsible for defining electoral districts in the State of New Hampshire

662:5

RSA 662:5 details State Representative districts in the State of New Hampshire as the following:

See also
New Hampshire Secretary of State
Bill Gardner

New Hampshire statutes